Jodia is a genus of moths of the family Noctuidae erected by Jacob Hübner in 1818.

Species
 Jodia croceago (Denis & Schiffermüller, 1775)
 Jodia sericea (Butler, 1878)

References

Cuculliinae